Contract awarding is the method used during a procurement in order to evaluate the proposals (tender offers) taking part and award the relevant contract. Usually at this stage the eligibility of the proposals have been concluded. So it remains to choose the most preferable among the proposed.
There are several different methods for this, which are obviously related to the proposition method asked by the procurement management.

Methods

Least price
This method is the simplest and oldest of all. Under this the procurement contract is awarded to the best price.
Some relevant methods are these of examining the overall or in parts and in total discount in a given price list or on a given budget. One of the proposed for Public tenders by the EC.

Most economically advantageous
This is applicable to proposals of different quality within the limits set. Under this the proposals are graded according to their price for value and the contract is awarded to the one with the best grade.
Similar to this is the grading of the proposals according to time, making the proposals needing less time of implementation seem more valuable. One of the proposed for Public tenders by the EC.

Mean value
The contract is awarded to a bid closer to the mean value of the proposals. This may apply to procurements where numerous proposals are expected and there is a need for a market-representing value.

Exclusion of the extremes
Under this method the proposals that are deviating the most from the mass of the proposals are excluded and then the procedure continues with one of the above methods.

There are also many variants and/or combinations of these main methods.

See also
Contract
Contract theory
Government procurement
Public works
Tender offer
Contract Management

References

External links 
 European Commission - Public Procurement

Law and economics
Government procurement